Jean Mill (May 14, 1926 – June 6, 2018) was an American cat breeder and a conservationist who worked to protect the Asian leopard cat. Mill is best known as the founder of the modern Bengal cat breed: Mill successfully crossed the wild Asian leopard cat with a domestic cat, and then backcrossed the offspring through five generations to create the domestic Bengal. Mill made contributions in two other cat breeds: the Himalayan and the standardized version of the Egyptian Mau. Mill and her first husband, Robert Sugden, were involved in a precedent-setting case about the United States government's power to monitor short wave radio communications. She also authored two books.

Conservation efforts and breeding rationale

Jean Mill was concerned about the hunting and poaching of the Asian Leopard cats to supply the fur and pet trades. Mill has said that her desire to save the Asian Leopard cat led to the creation of the Bengal cat breed. Mill claimed that she started crossing Asian Leopard cats with domestic cats to help prevent poaching. She gave two reasons for her breeding rationale: if people could purchase a cat that looked like a wild leopard, the actual Asian Leopard mothers would not be killed in the wild for fur; and the cubs would not be taken to be sold to customers.

Himalayan cat contributions
Jean Mill began work on the Himalayan cat in 1948, breeding Persian and Siamese cats together. She said she originated the breed by 1954 and was showing off her prizewinning cats by 1960.

Creating the Bengal breed
There were several other breeders involved in developing the Bengal breed, most notably Pat Warren, William Engle and Willard Centerwall. Jean Mill is considered the originator of the breed because she created a domestic Bengal past the F4 generation, and then tirelessly promoted the new breed.

1960s: Mill's first hybrid cat
In 1963 Mill lived in Yuma Arizona: it was there that Mill crossed a domestic tomcat with an Asian leopard cat. This mating was thought to be the first documented mating of a Wild Asian Leopard to a Domestic cat. Jean Sudgen purchased a female Asian Leopard cat (named Malaysia) from a pet store in 1961. She put a black domestic tomcat in her cage. The animals mated and produced two kittens, a male and a female called KinKin.

1970s
In 1970 Mill restarted her breeding program and in 1975 she received of a group of Bengal cats which had been bred for use in Loma Linda, CA by Willard Centerwall. When Centerwall concluded his studies he gifted the cats from the study to Jean Mill. Mill used these hybrids from Centerwall in her Bengal breeding program.

1982 Spotted domestic cats from India
The curator of the New Delhi Zoo also gave Mill the sister of the cat in the rhinoceros cage which Mill named Tasha of New Delhi. These two Indian domestic cats Toby and Tasha contributed greatly to the Bengal breed.

1982 Spotted domestic cats from India
Mill's breeding efforts began to take shape in the 1980s. In 1982 Mill obtained a spotted domestic cat from a shelter. Later in 1982, while traveling in India, Mill found another spotted domestic cat living in a zoo. The zookeepers captured the orange spotted cat (later named Toby of Delhi) and gave him to Mill. When Mill returned to the United States she used the orange spotted cat from the zoo along with the spotted cat from the pound, to breed with the hybrid cats she received.

Egyptian Mau breeding
Mill registered Millwood Tory of Delhi as an Egyptian Mau. Mill also imported other Egyptian Mau kittens from India. Mill also needed males to stud the F1 and F2 kittens resulting from the Asian Leopard cat since hybrid males are often sterile. Mill also used Egyptian Maus to raise her F1 Bengal kittens.

Bengal cat breeding resumed
Mill combined her spotted domestic cats with the Centerwall cats and with that Mill was able to restart her Bengal breeding program in the early 1980s: where others breeders had failed to get the Bengal breed established because of the sterility of the F1, F2, F3, and F4 early generation Bengals, Jean Mill succeeded. Mill successfully backcrossed Bengals until she achieved the F5 Bengal with a domestic cat temperament. Others also began breeding Bengals – and in 1986 The International Cat Association (TICA) accepted the Bengal cat as a new breed, giving them championship status in 1991. Where other early Bengal breeders like William Engle only succeeded in creating a sterile hybrid, Jean Mill succeeded in creating a Domestic Bengal cat.

Jean Mill's cattery was called Millwood. One of her earliest customers was a breeder named Gene Ducote of Gogees Bengals. Ducote has said one of her favorite Jean Mill quotes is: "Beauty always wins out..."

Education
Mill earned a degree from Pomona College in psychology in 1948. For a genetics assignment as a graduate student at UC Davis in 1946, Mill proposed crossing Persian and Siamese cats to make 'Panda Bear' cats.

Personal life
Jean Mill was born May 14, 1926 in Des Moines. Mill attended Roosevelt High School and then moved to California to attend college.

Jean Mill married a wealthy rancher and cotton farmer named Robert Sugden and moved to his ranch in Yuma, Arizona. In 1949, she was queen of the Yuma Jaycees' fourth annual rodeo. After Robert Sugden died in 1965, she move into an apartment and put her conservation/breeding efforts on hold. The Sugden's had a daughter (Judith Alice Sugden) October 15, 1948.

United States of America v. Robert V. H. Sugden and Jean S. Sugden
On October 7, 1953, Jean Mill and her first husband Robert Sugden were both indicted for conspiracy to violate the immigration laws. The main government evidence was obtained by listening to the Sugdens' shortwave radio communications. The U.S. Government alleged that the Sugdens used shortwave radio broadcasts to warn their foremen to hide their illegal-alien workers. The Federal Communications Commission suspended the Sugdens' Radio Telephone Operating permit. Robert Sugden alone was indicted for concealing and shielding illegal entrants into the United States from detection. The charges revolved around allegations of employing Mexican nationals...It is alleged that the Sugdens took various steps to hide the illegal entrants and avoid being caught with them in their employ." Judge Ling dismissed the charges in the spring of 1954 because the case Judge determined that short wave radio evidence was not obtained legally. The Government then appealed the dismissal of evidence to the United States Court of Appeals for the Ninth Circuit since they had merely monitored short wave radio broadcasts of the Sugdens (not wiretapped). In 1955 the United States was able to win their appeal to get the short wave radio evidence admitted in the case against the Sugdens. The 9th Circuit Court of Appeals ruled that because the Sugdens were not licensed to operate the short wave radio at the time of the broadcasts; the FCC may make full disclosure to the Immigration service.

Jean Mill got married a second time to John Krummel and together they lived in Pasadena, California until they divorced.

In 1975, Mill married engineer Robert James Mill in Los Angeles County, California, and moved to his one-acre horse property in Covina Hills, California. Jean Mill and Bob Mill continued to live in California and they bred Bengal cats under the name Millwood. Bob Mill died September 21, 1999.

Death and legacy

Jean Mill died on June 6, 2018. Mill created a domestic Bengal cat with markings like a leopard and the temperament of a house cat in order to protect wild cats from overhunting.

As of 2019, Bengal breeders number in the thousands. Jean Mill got the Bengal cat accepted into TICA in 1986. Since that time Bengals have been accepted into all of the cat registries: CFA, FIFe, WCF, ACF, ACFA/CAA, QCCF, and New Zealand Cat Fancy (NZCF).

Jean Mill also inspired her daughter Judy Sugden to create a new cat breed, the Toyger.

Books

Breeding Better Bengals: Facts and Fallacies (1999)

References

External links
 TICA's June 2018 Newsletter — Remembering Jean Mill
 Vox video on cat breeding, featuring Mill's story

1926 births
2018 deaths
Cat fanciers
University of California, Davis alumni
Pomona College alumni
Theodore Roosevelt High School (Iowa) alumni